Alea (before 1928: Μπουγιάτι – Bougiati) is a village and a former community in Argolis, Peloponnese, Greece. Since the 2011 local government reform it is part of the municipality Argos-Mykines, of which it is a municipal unit. The municipal unit has an area of 143.206 km2. In 2011 its population was 103 for the village and 660 for the municipal unit.  The seat of the community was Skoteini. Alea is situated in the mountainous northwestern part of Argolis, 5 km southeast of Kandila, 12 km northwest of Lyrkeia, 14 km northeast of Levidi and 27 km north of Tripoli. The Greek National Road 66 (Levidi – Nemea) passes near Skoteini.

Subdivisions
The municipal unit Alea is subdivided into the following communities (constituent villages in brackets):
Agios Nikolaos (Agios Nikolaos, Exochi, Platani)
Alea
Frousiouna
Skoteini

Population

History

Alea was an ancient city of Arcadia, founded by the mythical king Aleus, a son of Apheidas. It was situated near Stymphalos.  The city had temples of Artemis of Ephesus, Athena Alea and Dionysus.  Every other year the Skiereia, a celebration for the god Dionysus, were celebrated. Traces of ancient buildings have been found near the modern village.

See also

List of settlements in Argolis

References

External links
Alea at the GTP Travel Pages

Populated places in Argolis